Pseudophyllus is a genus of bush-cricket, found in Indo-China and Malesia (including the Philippines).  It is the type genus of the tribe Pseudophyllini and the subfamily Pseudophyllinae.

Species
Pseudophyllus includes the following species:
Pseudophyllus colosseus (Hebard, 1922) - Borneo
Pseudophyllus dyaka (Hebard, 1922) - Borneo
Pseudophyllus hercules (Karny, 1923) - Peninsular Malaysia, Borneo
Pseudophyllus ligatus (Brunner von Wattenwyl, 1895) - China
Pseudophyllus neriifolius (Lichtenstein, 1796) - type species (as Locusta neriifolia Lichtenstein; type locality Java, but also Sumatra)
Pseudophyllus simplex Beier, 1954 
Pseudophyllus teter Walker, 1869 - Philippines
Pseudophyllus titan White, 1846 - Indochina

References

External links

Tettigoniidae genera
Pseudophyllinae
Orthoptera of Asia